In March, 2008, led by green entrepreneur, Richard Stromback, and Virgin group owner, Richard Branson came up with the concept of the Ecology Summit to bring together moguls of the corporate world to address the threat of the corporate world on the environment.

See also

 Business action on climate change

References

External links
   article in The New York Times

Environmental conferences
2008 conferences
2008 in the environment